Argentina rugby team may refer to:

Argentina national rugby union team
Argentina national rugby league team